Assistant Secretary of the Air Force (Installations, Environment & Energy) (abbreviated SAF/IE) is the title of a civilian office in the United States Department of the Air Force. Along with the four other Assistant Secretaries of the Air Force, the Assistant Secretary of the Air Force (Installations, Environment & Environment) assists the United States Secretary of the Air Force and the United States Under Secretary of the Air Force.

By law, the Assistant Secretary of the Air Force (Installations, Environment & Energy) is appointed by the President of the United States "from civilian life with the advice and consent of the United States Senate." Unlike the other Assistant Secretaries, whose duties are statutorily defined, the office of Assistant Secretary of the Air Force (Installations, Environment & Energy) evolved to meet the needs of the United States Air Force as determined by the Secretary of the Air Force. The Assistant Secretary of the Air Force (Installations, Environment & Energy) is primarily tasked with all United States Air Force installations. This includes responsibility for all installations, environment, & energy required to keep the United States Air Force in a state of readiness, occupational safety and health on Air Force installations, and environmental issues related to maintaining the Air Force's fleet and installations. The Assistant Secretary of the Air Force (Installations, Environment & Energy) also manages the Office of Energy Assurance (OEA), which develops, implements and oversees an integrated facility energy portfolio.

The principal subordinate of the Assistant Secretary of the Air Force (Installations, Environment & Energy) is the Principal Deputy Assistant Secretary of the Air Force (Installations, Environment & Energy). Other major subordinates include the Deputy Assistant Secretary of the Air Force (Installations), the Deputy Assistant Secretary of the Air Force (Environment, Safety and Occupational Health), and the Deputy Assistant Secretary of the Air Force (Operational Energy).

List of Assistant Secretaries of the Air Force (Installations, Environment & Energy) (formerly Installations, Environment & Logistics)

References

External links
Website of Air Force Installations, Environment & Energy

 
United States Air Force